Greg Sczebel (born September 6, 1984), known as SEBELL, is a two-time Juno Award-winning independent singer-songwriter originally from Salmon Arm, British Columbia, Canada. He is a two-time grand prize winner in the John Lennon Songwriting Contest, a winner in the Billboard Worldwide Song Competition and was a finalist in the International Songwriting Competition.

In 2006 Sczebel was a special guest performer on CMT's "Paul Brandt's Christmas in Banff." In 2008 Sczebel joined Brandt's touring band and has performed with him regularly, playing keyboards and singing backing vocals. Sczebel has performed with Brandt at the 2008 Canada Day Celebrations on Parliament Hill in Ottawa, on numerous televised Canadian award shows (CCMA's, Junos), and most recently for Prince William and Kate Middleton during their visit to Canada.

Sczebel is endorsed by Yamaha USA Pianos and Keyboards. He has also been an active spokesperson on behalf of World Vision since 2005.

Greg Sczebel's second album, Love & the Lack Thereof released on October 13, 2009, won him a Juno Award for Contemporary Christian/Gospel Album of the Year at the 2011 Juno Awards, four awards at the 2010 GMA Canada Covenant Awards, and 8 BC Interior Music Awards (including Pop Album of the Year and Songwriter of the Year).

Discography

Albums and EPs 

 Here to Stay (Soultone, 2004, reviews)
 Love & the Lack Thereof (Soultone, 2009, review)
 SEBELL (2016)
 Songs For Flight Delays (2018)

Singles 
 "One Starry Night" (2006)
 "Love is the Anchor" (2007)
 "Till the Sun Burns Out" (2014)
 "Promiseland" (2016)
 "FOMY" (2017)

Songs in other projects 

 GMA Canada presents 30th Anniversary Collection, "Here To Stay" (CMC, 2008)
 Sea to Sea: Christmas, "One Starry Night" (LMG, 2009)

Awards 
Canadian Urban Music Awards (CUMA)
 2004 nominee, Gospel Recording of the Year: Here to Stay

GMA Canada Covenant Awards
 2004 Male Vocalist of the Year
 2004 Rap/Hip Hop/Dance Song of the Year: "Lights Are Comin' On"
 2005 Compilation Album of the Year: Filled With Your Glory, "Thank You" (Various Artists)
 2005 Urban Song of the Year: "Everybody"
 2006 nominee, Male Vocalist of the Year
 2007 nominee, Male Vocalist of the Year
 2007 nominee, Seasonal Song of the Year: "One Starry Night"
 2008 Song of the Year: "Love Is The Anchor"
 2010 Blessings "Fan Choice Award" 
 2010 Male Vocalist of the Year
 2010 Pop/Contemporary Album of the Year: Love & The Lack Thereof
 2010 Video of the Year: "I Will Come"

International Songwriting Competition (ISC)
 2005 Finalist, Gospel/Christian Music: "In The Pocket"
 2007 Third Place, Gospel/Christian Music: "Homeland"
 2007 Semi-Finalist, Pop/Top 40: "Love Is The Anchor"

John Lennon Songwriting Contest
 2004 Grand Prize Winner, Gospel Category: "Here to Stay"
 2005 Finalist, Session I, R&B Category: "You've Got It"
 2007 Grand Prize Winner, Session II, Gospel Category: "Homeland"

Juno Awards
 2005 Contemporary Christian/Gospel Album of the Year: Here To Stay
 2011, Contemporary Christian/Gospel Album of the Year: Love & the Lack Thereof

Shai Awards (formerly The Vibe Awards)
 2003 Best Emerging Artist
 2005 Contemporary/Pop Album of the Year: Here to Stay
 2005 Urban/Soul Album of the Year: Here to Stay
 2005 Song of the Year: "In the Pocket"

Western Canadian Music Awards
 2005 Outstanding Christian Recording: Here to Stay

References

External links 
 Greg Sczebel bio at Hearitfirst.com. Retrieved 2009-01-25.
 Greg Sczebel's MySpace. Retrieved 2009-01-25.
 Greg Sczebel at PureVolume. Retrieved 2009-01-25.

Juno Award for Contemporary Christian/Gospel Album of the Year winners
Canadian songwriters
Canadian performers of Christian music
Musicians from British Columbia
People from Salmon Arm
1984 births
Living people
21st-century Canadian male singers